Roberto Tamés (born 21 August 1964) is a Mexican bobsledder. He competed at the 1988, 1992 and the 2002 Winter Olympics.

References

1964 births
Living people
Mexican male bobsledders
Olympic bobsledders of Mexico
Bobsledders at the 1988 Winter Olympics
Bobsledders at the 1992 Winter Olympics
Bobsledders at the 2002 Winter Olympics
Sportspeople from Guadalajara, Jalisco